Louise Allcock is a British researcher, best known for her work on ecology and evolution of the cephalopods of the Southern Ocean and deep sea. She is the editor of the Zoological Journal of the Linnean Society.

Early life and education
Allcock graduated in marine biology (with honours) at the University of Liverpool in 1992. She went on to earn a PhD there in 1998.

Career and impact
Allcock is the editor of the Zoological Journal of the Linnean Society and was co-editor of the Journal of Natural History from 2007–2015. She was the president of the Cephalopod International Advisory Council (CIAC) from 2012–2015.

Allcock has also worked on gender equality, and is a member of the gender equality task force in Ireland. She has highlighted the role and impact of female researchers in cephalopod research.

Allcock's research focuses on the ecology, evolutionary biology and systematics of molluscs. Her research expertise also lies in benthic ecology. She has participated in cruises in and around the Antarctic and the South Atlantic Ocean, sometimes as leader. As of summer 2016, she is working on taxonomically poor sponges, cnidarians and ascidians. Since 2013, Allcock has been a lecturer in zoology at NUI Galway. She has also served as Bipolar species co-ordinator for the British Antarctic Survey from (June 2009 to March 2010), lecturer in Marine Biology, Queen's University Belfast (September 2002 to March 2008) and Curator of Mollusca, National Museums of Scotland, Edinburgh (July 1998 to August 2002). On 1 February 2018, Allcock was one of the guests on the BBC Radio 4 discussion programme In Our Time, hosted by Melvyn Bragg, about Cephalopods.

Awards and honours
Allcock was the last author on the best scientific paper on cephalopod research 2006–2009 awarded by the Cephalopod International Advisory Council (CIAC). The paper on the origin for deep-sea octopuses was also the highlight in the Census of Marine Life press release at the 1st World Congress of Marine Biodiversity, Valencia 2008.

Selected publications 
Strugnell, J.M., Norman, M.D., Vecchione, M., Guzik, M. and Allcock, A.L., 2014. The ink sac clouds octopod evolutionary history. Hydrobiologia, 725(1), pp. 215–235.

Wilson, A.M., Kiriakoulakis, K., Raine, R., Gerritsen, H.D., Blackbird, S., Allcock, A.L. and White, M., 2015. Anthropogenic influence on sediment transport in the Whittard Canyon, NE Atlantic. Marine pollution bulletin, 101(1), pp. 320–329.
Finn, D.I., Clarke, M., Gilbert, M.T.P., Allcock, L., Kampmann, M.L., Schroeder, H., Guerra, A., Norman, M., Winkelmann, J.I., Campos, P.F. and Strugnell, J., 2013. Mitochondrial genome diversity and population structure of.
Allcock, A.L. and Strugnell, J.M., 2012. Southern Ocean diversity: new paradigms from molecular ecology. Trends in ecology & evolution, 27(9), pp. 520–528.
 Octopus, Squid, and Cuttlefish: A Visual Scientific Guide to the Oceans' Most Advanced Invertebrates, Roger Hanlon, Mike Vecchione, Louise Allcock, University of Chicago Press, 2018

References

External links 
 
 marinescience.ie/wp-content/uploads/2015/12/Dr-A-Louise-Allcock-CV.pdf
 deepseaexperts.org/node/561
 nuigalway.ie/our-research/people/natural-sciences/louiseallcock/

Living people
Alumni of the University of Liverpool
British marine biologists
British women scientists
British editors
British women editors
British Antarctic scientists
Teuthologists
Women Antarctic scientists
Women marine biologists
Year of birth missing (living people)
Academic journal editors